Pilodeudorix azurea is a butterfly in the family Lycaenidae. It is found in south-western Uganda and Etoumbi in the Republic of the Congo. The habitat consists of primary forests.

References

Butterflies described in 1964
Deudorigini